Telok Kurau Secondary School (TKSS) was a co-educational secondary school in Bedok, Singapore.

History
The school was established in 1965, and was small by Singapore standards, with a student population of 800 and permanent teaching staff of around 45.

Closure
At the end of 2010, Telok Kurau Secondary School was closed down and all students were transferred to Broadrick Secondary School.

Academic Programme
The school offered a four-year express programme leading to GCE 'O' Level, and an academic programme for the students who follow the Normal Academic and Normal Technical path. All Express students in Telok Kurau were offered pure physics, chemistry, and biology besides additional maths.

Campus 
The school campus stood on Chin Cheng Avenue along Still Road, not far away from Eunos MRT station.

Notable alumni
 Hawazi Daipi: Former Member of Parliament
 Muhamad Faisal Manap: Member of Parliament, Aljunied GRC, 2011-
 Woon Tai Ho: Founder, Channelnewsasia
 Marvin Lim Chun Kiat: Singapore ranked No.1 snooker player

References

Former secondary schools in Singapore
Educational institutions established in 1965
Bedok
1965 establishments in Singapore